Anjala was a town in Southern Finland, which merged in 1975 with Sippola to form Anjalankoski, later further merged into Kouvola.

Anjala is remembered historically in connection with the 18th-century event known as the Anjala Conspiracy.

The Regina School, one of the country's first public schools, was located here, as was its library, which was the first in the country.

People born in Anjala
Gustaf Philip Creutz (1731–1785)
Otto Wrede (1851–1936)
Kari Rajamäki (b. 1948)
Jouko Jääskeläinen (b. 1952)

References 

Populated places disestablished in 1975
Former municipalities of Finland